How to Raise an Ox is the seventh studio album by Italian band Zu, released in 2006, in collaboration with Mats Gustafsson on saxophone.

Track listing
 Over a Furnace			
 How to Raise an Ox			
 Eating the Landscape			
 King Devours His Sons			
 Bring the War Back Home			
 Meat Eater, Solar Bird			
 Palace of Reptiles			
 Beasts Only Die to Be Born			
 Tiger Teaches the Lamb

Personnel
Mats Gustafsson (baritone saxophone)
Luca (baritone saxophone)
Massimo (bass guitar)
Jacopo (drums)

References

Zu (band) albums
2006 albums